Jessica Pilot is an American television producer and writer. She often speaks at industry round tables and workshops regarding her profession. She was featured on CNN for their series "The History of Comedy."

Career 
Pilot is best known as the talent booker for The Late Show with Stephen Colbert where she produces the stand up comedy segments of the show.

Pilot's writing revolves around the world of stand up comedy. Pilot has written articles that have been published in Vanity Fair, Esquire, New York magazine, The Village Voice, and other outlets.

In 2018, Pilot started a podcast called "Are We Still Talking About This?"

Pilot created a documentary series for The Village Voice titled "This is Stand Up" where she interviewed several comedians on the art form. In 2019 she created the mental health series "Hi Anxiety" for Teen Vogue.

References

External links

American television producers
American women television producers
American television writers
Living people
American women television writers
Year of birth missing (living people)
21st-century American women